is a real-time strategy and puzzle video game series created by Shigeru Miyamoto, and published by Nintendo. The games focus on directing a horde of plant-like creatures called Pikmin in order to collect items by destroying obstacles, avoiding hazards and fighting fauna that are hazardous to both the player character and the Pikmin.

The Pikmin series features four main entries, as well as two spin-offs. The first two, Pikmin (2001) and Pikmin 2 (2004), were released for the GameCube and later ported to the Wii as New Play Control! titles in 2008 and 2009. Pikmin 2 was re-released in the Nintendo Selects series in 2012. A third installment, Pikmin 3, was released for the Wii U in 2013. The series' first handheld game, Hey! Pikmin, was released for the Nintendo 3DS in 2017. Pikmin 4 was announced to be in development by Miyamoto in September 2015, and was officially confirmed for release in 2023 during a Nintendo Direct in September 2022. Pikmin Bloom, the series' mobile spin-off, was released for iOS and Android in 2021.

Gameplay

The series' gameplay combines elements of action platformer with puzzle and strategy gameplay. The Pikmin games focus on exploring an Earth-like planet named PNF-404, and controlling a crowd of the titular Pikmin. Pikmin are intelligent, loyal, multicolored, plant-animal hybrids that follow the orders of their leader. There have been multiple leaders over the course of the series, with the first and most notable being Captain Olimar, a tiny alien from the planet Hocotate introduced in the original Pikmin. Pikmin 2 features Louie and The President, Olimar's co-worker and boss, respectively, who are also playable leaders. Pikmin 3 features leaders from a new alien species. The leaders are Alph, Brittany, and Charlie, who come from the planet Koppai and are similar to the Hocotatians.

Pikmin are directed to perform a number of tasks, with the primary one being the retrieval of items integral to the mission of each game. The player must direct the Pikmin to overcome obstacles and PNF-404's fauna. Because individual Pikmin are small and weak against most predators, and some are best suited for certain tasks, it is the responsibility of the player to direct the Pikmin appropriately in order to ensure successful retrievals of any items, avoid any hazards, and quickly tend to any obstacles and predators. Game time is divided into individual days, each of which consist of approximately 13 minutes, in which the player is encouraged to accomplish as much as possible before sunset.

Pikmin appear in a variety of colors, which signify the Pikmin's abilities and resistance to environmental hazards. The number of Pikmin and their abilities have shifted over the course of the franchise, with the first Pikmin game featuring three colors: Red, Yellow, and Blue. Red Pikmin are immune to fire, Blue Pikmin can move through water thanks to their gills, and Yellow Pikmin can be thrown higher than other Pikmin, and are able to carry bomb rocks. In Pikmin 2, Yellow Pikmin have lost their ability to carry bomb rocks in exchange for being immune to electrical hazards, and White and Purple Pikmin are introduced. White Pikmin are the fastest, resistant to poisonous gases, capable of poisoning enemies, and capable of spotting objects buried underground. In comparison, Purple Pikmin are significantly stronger and heavier than the other types, which makes them excellent at inflicting damage and carrying heavy items.

Pikmin 3 introduced two more types: the gray-colored Rock Pikmin, and the pink-colored Winged Pikmin. Rock Pikmin can break crystalline materials, cannot be crushed or impaled, and inflict the most damage out of all Pikmin types when thrown. In comparison, Winged Pikmin can fly freely, and can fly high which enables them to recover elevated items and attack airborne enemies with ease. In addition to making each type capable of carrying bomb rocks, Pikmin 3 also adjusted the abilities of Yellow, Blue, White, and Purple Pikmin. Yellow Pikmin are tied with Rock Pikmin for the fastest digging speed; Blue Pikmin are capable of swimming; White Pikmin are tied with Winged Pikmin for the lowest attack strength, and slowest digging speed; Purple Pikmin are tied with Red Pikmin for second highest attack strength, and second fastest digging speed.

Outside of coloration, all types of Pikmin share the same method of indicating their strength and swiftness: the stalk atop their heads will sport either a leaf, bud or flower, which develops when Pikmin are fed nectar or left planted in the ground for a certain amount of time. By extension, all types of Pikmin are stored in their respective motherships, referred to as "Onions", for safety after sunset, as they are vulnerable to nocturnal predators. The Onions play a vital role in Pikmin reproduction: when any food, such as prey or pellets, is delivered to an Onion, it propagates seeds, which grow and are plucked from the ground as fully developed Pikmin. An Onion serves as an incubator for all Pikmin of its respective color, housing the Pikmin. The Onions travel alongside Olimar as he flies to different locations on the planet.

Plot

Characters

Protagonists 
The main protagonist of the series is Captain Olimar, an employee of the Hocotate Freight Company, who flies a ship known as the S.S. Dolphin, a reference to the GameCube's developmental code name. He has a wife, son and daughter. Pikmin 2 introduces Louie, a co-worker of Olimar, who places the Hocotate Freight Company in debt after losing a shipment of gold pikpik carrots to a "ravenous space bunny". The names "Olimar" and "Louie" are based on Mario and Luigi, who were also created by Shigeru Miyamoto.

In Pikmin 3, three new characters succeed Olimar as playable leaders: Alph the engineer, Brittany the botanist, and Captain Charlie. All three characters come from Koppai, a planet whose inhabitants are similar to the Hocotations, and they interact with each other through in-game dialogue. Though not playable during the game's story, Olimar and Louie both appear later in the game's story and become integral to its plot, are playable in Bingo Battle Mode and five of the downloadable mission levels, and Olimar's expedition logs are later discovered by the crew and offer helpful advice regarding PNF-404.

Pikmin creatures 
After becoming stranded on the unknown planet in Pikmin, Olimar becomes acquainted with the species of plant-like beings that he names "Pikmin" because they resemble the "Pikpik" brand of carrots on his home planet of Hocotate. They are small, brightly colored creatures who are each as tall as a US dime. They follow any command: from attacking enemies and defending Olimar to retrieving large artifacts. Pikmin are generally very weak, unless they are used in hordes, as the Pikmin are excellent at working together. Pikmin speak with strange, squeaking noises. Simple commands can, however, be communicated to them by the use of a whistle or any other device capable of producing high-pitched noises.

Pikmin come in several colors, each with their own strengths and weaknesses. In Pikmin, there are three types of Pikmin: Red Pikmin, who are better in combat and can withstand extreme heat and fire; Yellow Pikmin, who can be thrown higher, can use bomb rocks (Pikmin only), are immune to electricity (Pikmin 2, Pikmin 3, and Hey! Pikmin), and can dig faster (Pikmin 3 only); and Blue Pikmin, which have gills and can walk in water (or get splashed with water-based attacks) without drowning. There are also Mushroom Pikmin who attack the other types of Pikmin. They are created when regular Pikmin are infected by spores let out by the Puffstool.

In Pikmin 2, three new species of Pikmin were introduced: Purple Pikmin, White Pikmin, and Bulbmin. Purple Pikmin move slower than normal Pikmin, but have ten times the strength and weight of other Pikmin, giving them the ability to pick up much heavier objects and attack and destroy obstacles and other enemies with fewer numbers. They also have the potential to stun enemies when they land near or on them. White Pikmin, when ingested by enemies, damage the enemy through being toxic. White Pikmin themselves are immune to poison, can locate buried treasure with their special eyes, and can run faster than other Pikmin. Bulbmin are a subterranean parasitic species of Pikmin that infect Bulborbs (the most common enemy found within the Pikmin series) and take control of them. These Pikmin are found exclusively within certain cave systems in the game, usually as a pack of up to 10 juvenile Bulbmin and a single adult Bulbmin. While the adult forms of these Pikmin are hostile towards Olimar, the juvenile Bulbmin will follow Olimar like regular Pikmin once the adult is killed. They are immune to most hazards (save explosions, being eaten, being crushed, and bottomless pits), and will not follow Olimar when he leaves the cave they are found in. The only way to "keep" them is if they are transformed into other Pikmin species by Candypop Buds.

Pikmin 3 introduced two new species of Pikmin: Rock Pikmin and Winged Pikmin. The gray-colored Rock Pikmin look like small rocks and can smash through glass, crystals, ice, and the carapaces of large creatures. These Pikmin can also survive crushing attacks from boulders and enemies, and are invulnerable to piercing attacks as well. Rock Pikmin also cause more initial damage when thrown at an enemy, though they are unable to latch onto them. The pink-colored Winged Pikmin are the smallest species of Pikmin and hover in the air using their small wings. They can fly over hazards such as water and pits, and can carry items in the air.

In Pikmin 4, the game introduces Ice Pikmin. Ice Pikmin have the ability to freeze enemies and the environment.

Other characters 
Another main character in Pikmin 2 is the President of Hocotate Freight, a large man that runs the company and keeps debt collectors away. The president is forced to sell the Dolphin, and it is replaced by an unnamed ship that is able to speak, name and value the treasure on the planet.

Development

2001–2003: Pikmin

Pikmin is the first game in the series, released in 2001. The game's plot focuses on Captain Olimar's predicament of having crash-landed on an unknown planet and befriending plant-animal creatures that he dubs as Pikmin. Olimar has to gather the missing pieces of his broken spaceship in order to escape, before his air supply completely runs out and he succumbs to the planet's oxygen-rich atmosphere, which is poisonous to his species. Pikmin features three endings, which are dependent on the number of spaceship parts reclaimed. Reclaiming all thirty parts by the final day results in the best ending: Olimar waves goodbye to the Pikmin, who proceed to defend themselves on their own at nighttime, while Onions of various colors observe his departure off as he looks back on the unknown planet before returning home. Reclaiming at least the twenty-five required parts by the final day results in the normal ending: Olimar quickly departs, while one of each type of Pikmin run toward his ship to watch him depart. Lastly, failing to reclaim the twenty-five required parts by the final day results in the worst ending: Olimar crash-lands back onto the planet, succumbs to oxygen poisoning, and is taken by a number of Pikmin to be placed into an Onion, which converts him into a Pikmin-Hocotatian hybrid.

Pikmin was ported to the Wii in 2009 as a New Play Control! title, which was made available on the Wii U's Virtual Console service in North America in 2016.

2004–2012: Pikmin 2

Pikmin 2, released in 2004, takes place immediately following the events of Pikmin. When Olimar returns to his home planet Hocotate, he discovers that his employer, Hocotate Freight, has gone into severe debt. When the company's president discovers that the souvenir that Olimar has brought back with him is significantly valuable, he orders Olimar and Louie, another employee, to journey back to the Pikmin planet and gather treasure to pay off the debt. The main objective of Pikmin 2 is to collect human garbage that is referred to as treasure on Hocotate, including bottle caps and gadgets. The player controls both Olimar and Louie, alternating between the two characters in order to divide and accomplish more tasks during a single day. Unlike the first game, Pikmin 2 has no deadline, so the player can spend as many days as desired to collect all the treasure.

Like its predecessor, Pikmin 2 was ported to the Wii in 2009 (or 2012 in North America) as a New Play Control! title, which was made available on the Wii U's Virtual Console service in Europe in 2016.

2013–2022: Pikmin 3 and spin-offs

Shigeru Miyamoto hinted about the possibilities of a new Pikmin game in a July 2007 interview with IGN, saying "I certainly don't think we've seen the last of Pikmin. I definitely would like to do something with them, and I think the Wii interface in particular is very well suited to that franchise." A later CNET.com interview in April 2008 reported that "For now, Miyamoto looks ahead to other projects for the Wii, mentioning his desire to continue the Pikmin series." A new Pikmin game was confirmed at E3 2008 during Nintendo's developer roundtable, in which Miyamoto stated that his team were working on a new entry in the series. Miyamoto confirmed that Pikmin 3 would be released on the Wii. He also stated that the Wii's controls were "working well" with the game. The announcement in October 2008 of a re-release of the first two Pikmin games on the Wii with updated motion controls, raised concerns about whether Pikmin 3 was in fact in development. However, in a subsequent interview with IGN, it was made clear that the re-releases of Pikmin and Pikmin 2 under the New Play Control! brand were separate from Pikmin 3. The game was not shown at E3 2009, 2010, or 2011, but Miyamoto confirmed in June 2010 that the game was indeed still in development. At Miyamoto's roundtable discussion at E3 2011, Miyamoto stated that Pikmin 3 development was moved to Wii U, the Wii successor. He said that the HD graphics for the next system and its special screen-based controller would work better for it. On April 15, 2012, Miyamoto said in a Spanish interview that a new Pikmin game and a new New Super Mario Bros. game will both be showcased for the Wii U at E3 2012. He also added the comment "Anyone who played the original Pikmin games will enjoy playing it." On June 5, 2012, at Nintendo's E3 press conference, Pikmin 3 was announced and featured a trailer that revealed the inclusion of the new Rock Pikmin. Six days later, a second trailer was released that revealed the new Winged Pikmin and other aspects of the game. Although originally intended to be released within the Wii U's launch window, Pikmin 3 was delayed and instead released in mid-2013.

On August 5, 2020, Nintendo announced Pikmin 3 Deluxe, an enhanced port of Pikmin 3 for the Nintendo Switch, for release on October 30, 2020 via Twitter.

A Nintendo 3DS entry in the series was announced in a Nintendo Direct in September 2016 as a side-scrolling action game due for release in 2017. In another Nintendo Direct in April 2017, the game's title was announced as Hey! Pikmin and its release date was announced to be July 28, 2017. The game was developed by Arzest.

On March 22, 2021, Niantic, known primarily for the mobile game Pokémon Go, announced a Pikmin game for mobile devices. Little was known at the time of announcement, except that it will feature similar gameplay to Pokémon Go, using AR technology. A playable prototype was released for select users in Singapore the same day the game was announced. On October 26, 2021, the game was revealed to be titled Pikmin Bloom and launched immediately in Australia and Singapore.

2023–present: Pikmin 4

In September 2015, Miyamoto said that Pikmin 4 was in development and "very close to completion". At E3 2017, he said that its development was still progressing. Pikmin 4 was officially announced in a Nintendo Direct on September 13, 2022, with the game set for release in 2023 on the Nintendo Switch.

Reception

The Pikmin series has received generally positive reviews, and has sold over 6 million units, with the Nintendo Switch port of Pikmin 3 being the best seller at 2.23 million units. The series has been praised for its strategic gameplay based on time and resource management, as well as its graphics; Philip Kollar of Polygon described Pikmin 3 as "one of those rare pieces of evidence that a modern Nintendo can still produce something wholly unique."

Legacy
Olimar was introduced as a playable character in the Super Smash Bros. series beginning with 2008's Super Smash Bros. Brawl, and has appeared in every subsequent entry. He commands the Pikmin in battle and, like in the Pikmin series, he is almost entirely dependent on them. Olimar is able to pluck new Pikmin from the ground at any time unless he has the maximum number of Pikmin allowed; he can command up to six in Brawl, and three in subsequent games. The Pikmin, as in the Pikmin series, are fragile and can be defeated easily, but new ones can be plucked from the stage immediately after. Olimar's Final Smash, a signature one-use technique, shows him getting into his Hocotate Spaceship and flying off into the sky, while Red Bulborbs attack the other players on the ground. The ship then plummets to the ground and causes an explosion, dealing damage and knockback to opposing players as Olimar is ejected from it. Super Smash Bros. Brawl also features a playable stage called Distant Planet, based on the general setting of the Pikmin's home planet featured in the first three Pikmin games. The same stage returned in Super Smash Bros. for Nintendo 3DS, while Super Smash Bros. for Wii U added a stage based on Pikmin 3; both stages returned in Super Smash Bros. Ultimate. Alph from Pikmin 3 appears as an alternate costume for Olimar beginning with 3DS and Wii U.

Pikmin appear in the Nintendo 3DS built-in application AR Games. Pikmin also make a cameo during the process of transferring downloadable content from a Nintendo DSi to a 3DS, (or transferring from a 3DS to another 3DS or 2DS) with various types of Pikmin carrying the data over. A similar animation occurs when transferring save data and other information from a Wii to an SD card using the Wii U transfer application, and a second animation, picking up where the first one leaves off, appears when completing the transfer from the SD card to a Wii U.

Nintendo Land includes the series in a team attraction titled Pikmin Adventure, where players' Miis fight robotic versions of familiar Pikmin foes. Pikmin Adventure utilizes the Wii U GamePad and Wii Remote; the former controls Olimar, whereas the latter allows other players to play as Pikmin. On the Game Boy Advance, the card-based Nintendo e-Reader peripheral included Pikmin minigames exclusive to Japan following the release of Pikmin 2, titled Pikmin 2-e. In the various minigames, players control either Olimar or the Pikmin to complete various puzzles.

Pikmin franchise amiibo figures can be used to unlock a Pikmin Mii costume in Mario Kart 8, and Pikmin character costumes in Super Mario Maker.

Several red, yellow and blue Pikmin can be found across the land on ledges of Super Nintendo World at Universal Studios Japan, with some carrying objects like coins from the Mario franchise and a berry.

Short films 
On November 5, 2014, three short animated Pikmin films were released on the Wii U and Nintendo 3DS eShop, after being shown at the Tokyo International Film Festival. The short films, "The Night Juicer", "Treasure in a Bottle", and "Occupational Hazards", each feature Captain Olimar and groups of Pikmin. To commemorate the films, puzzles related to them were made available in the Puzzle Swap game mode of StreetPass Mii Plaza. The films were later uploaded to YouTube to promote Pikmin 3 Deluxe.

Notes

References

 
Nintendo franchises
Post-apocalyptic video games
Puzzle video games
Real-time strategy video games
Science fiction video games
Video game franchises
Video game franchises introduced in 2001
Video games developed in Japan
Video games produced by Shigeru Miyamoto
Video games set on fictional planets
BAFTA winners (video games)